Alternative Gifts International is a charity on the BBB Wise Giving Alliance headquartered in Wichita, Kansas. It sponsors events known as Alternative Gift Markets.

See also
 Alternative giving

References

External links
 Alternative Gifts International

Charities based in Kansas
Organizations based in Wichita, Kansas